General Count Pyotr Ivanovich Panin (1721 – April 15, 1789), younger brother of Nikita Ivanovich Panin, fought with distinction in the Seven Years' War and in the Russo-Turkish War of 1768–1774, capturing Bender on September 26, 1770. In 1773–1775, he participated in suppressing Pugachev's Rebellion. He died in Moscow, as the senior General of the Russian Army. He is the father of Nikita Petrovich Panin.
 
Original text adapted from Meyers Konversations-Lexikon, 4th edition.

1721 births
1789 deaths
Russian nobility
Russian generals
Recipients of the Order of St. George of the First Degree
Pugachev's Rebellion
Russian military personnel of the Seven Years' War
People of the Russo-Turkish War (1768–1774)